Joh. Johannson was a wholesaling company in Norway.

It was founded by Johan Johannson in 1866, and named after him. The company was mainly a wholesaler of groceries. It remained in the ownership of the Johannson lineage, and Joh. Johannson was incorporated into NorgesGruppen in 2000, the Johannson family became majority stockholders. A daughter company, Joh. Johannson Kaffe still exists, and imports coffee which it sells under brands such as Ali and Evergood.

References

Wholesalers of Norway
Companies based in Oslo
Business services companies established in 1866
1866 establishments in Norway